In chemistry, a reactivity series (or activity series) is an empirical, calculated, and structurally analytical progression of a series of metals, arranged by their "reactivity" from highest to lowest. It is used to summarize information about the reactions of metals with acids and water, single displacement reactions and the extraction of metals from their ores.

Table

Going from the bottom to the top of the table the metals:
 increase in reactivity;
 lose electrons (oxidize) more readily to form positive ions;
 corrode or tarnish more readily;
 require more energy (and different methods) to be isolated from their compounds;
 become stronger reducing agents (electron donors).

Defining reactions 

There is no unique and fully consistent way to define the reactivity series, but it is common to use the three types of reaction listed below, many of which can be performed in a high-school laboratory (at least as demonstrations).

Reaction with water and acids 

The most reactive metals, such as sodium, will react with cold water to produce hydrogen and the metal hydroxide:

2 Na (s) + 2 H2O (l) →2 NaOH (aq) + H2 (g)

Metals in the middle of the reactivity series, such as iron, will react with acids such as sulfuric acid (but not water at normal temperatures) to give hydrogen and a metal salt, such as iron(II) sulfate:

Fe (s) + H2SO4 (l) → FeSO4 (aq) + H2 (g)

There is some ambiguity at the borderlines between the groups. Magnesium, aluminium and zinc can react with water, but the reaction is usually very slow unless the metal samples are specially prepared to remove the surface layer of oxide which protects the rest of the metal. Copper and silver will react with nitric acid; but because nitric acid is an oxidizing acid, the oxidizing agent is not the H+ ion as in normal acids, but the NO3− ion.

Comparison with standard electrode potentials 
The reactivity series is sometimes quoted in the strict reverse order of standard electrode potentials, when it is also known as the "electrochemical series".

The following list includes the metallic elements of the first six periods. It is mostly based on tables provided by NIST. However, not all sources give the same values: there are some differences between the precise values given by NIST and the CRC Handbook of Chemistry and Physics. In the first six periods this does not make a difference to the relative order, but in the seventh period it does, so the seventh-period elements have been excluded.

Hydrogen has been included as a benchmark, although it is not a metal. Metallicity has been defined by the "stairstep line", so germanium and antimony have been included. Some other elements in the middle of the 4d and 5d rows have been omitted (Zr–Tc, Hf–Os) when their simple cations are too highly charged or of rather doubtful existence. Greyed-out rows indicate values based on estimation rather than experiment.

The positions of lithium and sodium are changed on such a series.

Standard electrode potentials offer a quantitative measure of the power of a reducing agent, rather than the qualitative considerations of other reactive series. However, they are only valid for standard conditions: in particular, they only apply to reactions in aqueous solution. Even with this proviso, the electrode potentials of lithium and sodium and gold – and hence their positions in the electrochemical series – appear anomalous. The order of reactivity, as shown by the vigour of the reaction with water or the speed at which the metal surface tarnishes in air, appears to be
potassium > sodium > lithium > alkaline earth metals,
the same as the reverse order of the (gas-phase) ionization energies. This is borne out by the extraction of metallic lithium by the electrolysis of a eutectic mixture of lithium chloride and potassium chloride: lithium metal is formed at the cathode, not potassium.

See also
 Reactivity (chemistry), which discusses the inconsistent way that the term 'reactivity' is used in chemistry.

References

External links
 Science Line Chemistry

Inorganic chemistry